Birger A. Pearson (born 1934 in California, United States) is an American scholar and professor studying early Christianity and Gnosticism.  He currently holds the positions of Professor Emeritus of Religious Studies at the University of California, Santa Barbara and Professor and Interim Director of the Religious Studies Program at the University of California, Berkeley.

Earlier life
He has a B.A. in Classical languages from Upsala College in East Orange, New Jersey; a Bachelor of Divinity in Biblical Studies and Theology from Pacific Lutheran Theological Seminary in Berkeley, CA; an M.A. in Greek from the University of California, Berkeley; and a Ph.D. in New Testament and Christian Origins from Harvard University in Cambridge, Massachusetts. Pearson was elected a Member of the Catholic Biblical Association in 1978.

Work
Pearson was one of the original translators of the Nag Hammadi library, and was also involved with the 2007 translation by Marvin Meyer. In his writings, he explores the origins of Gnosticism and Christianity. Unlike many scholars, who see Gnosticism as a Christian heresy, Pearson believes that it emerged from Jewish mystics disaffected with the Jerusalem religious authorities, who were influenced by Platonism and mystery religion.

Publications
Ancient Gnosticism: Traditions and Literature (2007), Fortress Press, 
The Emergence of Christian Religion: Essays on Early Christianity (1997), Trinity Press International, 
The Future of Early Christianity: Essays in Honor of Helmut Koester (1991), Fortress Press, 
Gnosticism and Christianity in Roman and Coptic Egypt (Studies in Antiquity and Christianity) (2004), T & T Clark Publishers, 
Gnosticism, Judaism, and Egyptian Christianity (Studies in Antiquity and Christianity) (1990), Augsburg Fortress Publishers, 

His book, Ancient Gnosticism: Traditions and Literature, examines the primary texts for Gnostic beliefs, including Christian Gnosticism, Hermetic Gnosticism, Mandaeanism, and Manicheanism.

Honors 
In 2002 Pearson received an honorary doctorate from the Faculty of Theology at Uppsala University, Sweden.

In 2013, Practicing gnosis: ritual, magic, theurgy and liturgy in Nag Hammadi, Manichaean and other ancient literature was published in honor of Pearson.

References

1934 births
Living people
American religion academics
Upsala College alumni
Harvard Divinity School alumni
History of mystic traditions
University of California, Berkeley faculty
University of California, Santa Barbara faculty
Historians of Gnosticism